Hans Nils Erik Hansson  (born 26 November 1949) is a Swedish former professional ice hockey player.

He competed as a member of the Sweden men's national ice hockey team at the 1972 Winter Olympics held in Japan.

References

External links

1949 births
Living people
Mora IK players
Olympic ice hockey players of Sweden
People from Dalarna
Swedish ice hockey centres
Ice hockey players at the 1972 Winter Olympics